The Federated Malay States (FMS,) was a federation of four protected states in the Malay Peninsula—Selangor, Perak, Negeri Sembilan and Pahang—established by the British government in 1896, which lasted until 1946, when they, together with two of the former Straits Settlements (Malacca and Penang) and the Unfederated Malay States, formed the Malayan Union. Two years later, the Union became the Federation of Malaya, which achieved independence in 1957, and finally Malaysia in 1963 with the inclusion of North Borneo (present-day Sabah), Sarawak and Singapore.

Real power in the FMS and its constituent states rested with the four local British Residents and the Resident-General, the discretionary powers of the local sultans being essentially reduced to matters "touching Malay Religion and Customs".

The federation, along with the other Malay states and British possessions of the peninsula, was overrun and occupied by the Japanese during World War II.  After the liberation of Malaya following the Japanese surrender, the federation was not restored, but the federal form of government was retained as the principal model for consolidating the separate States as an independent Federation of Malaya and the Federation's later evolution into Malaysia.

Formation and power structure

On 20 January 1874, Sir Andrew Clarke, governor of the Straits Settlements, concluded with the Sultan of Perak the treaty of Pangkor whereby the Sultan agreed to "receive and provide a suitable residence for a British Officer to be called Resident, who shall be accredited to his court, and whose advice must be asked and acted upon on all questions other than those touching Malay Religion and Customs". The residency system was extended the same year to the states of Selangor and Negri Sembilan, and in 1888 to Pahang.

To promote greater administrative efficiency, these four states were brought together in 1895-1896 to form the Federated Malay States. This structure was highly centralized, real power resting in the hands of the agents of the British Government, at first called the Resident-General, and later the Chief Secretary.

The British established the Federal Council in 1898 to administer the Federation. It was headed by the High Commissioner (The Governor of the Straits Settlement), assisted by the Resident-General, the Sultans, the four state Residents and four nominated unofficial members. This structure remained until the Japanese invaded Malaya on 8 December 1941.

The sultans and First Durbar

Although the Resident-General was the real administrator of the federation, each of the four constituent states of the federation retained their respective hereditary rulers (sultans).  At the formation of the Federated Malay States, the reigning sultans were:

 Sultan Alaiddin Sulaiman Shah of Selangor
 Sultan Idris Murshidul ‘Adzam Shah I of Perak
 Yamtuan Tuanku Muhammad Shah of Negeri Sembilan
 Sultan Ahmad Mu’adzam Shah of Pahang

In 1897 the first Durbar was convened in the royal town of Kuala Kangsar, Perak as the platform for discussions for the four Rulers.  This formed the basis for the Conference of Rulers that was created later on under Article 38 of the Malaysian Constitution on 27 August 1957.

Flag and emblem of the Federation

Flag 

The Federated Malay States had a flag of its own until its dissolution in 1946. The flag consisted of four different-coloured stripes, from top to bottom: white, red, yellow and black. Different combinations of these colours represent the four states that formed the FMS — red, black and yellow are for Negeri Sembilan; black and white for Pahang; black, white and yellow for Perak; and red and yellow for Selangor. The same design concept is used in Malaysian national emblem.  In the middle is an oblong circle with a Malayan tiger in it.

The National History Museum located near the Dataran Merdeka in Kuala Lumpur, Malaysia has a replica of the federation's flag.

Coat of arms
The coat of arms of the Federated Malay States featured a shield guarded by two tigers. On the top of the shield is the crown (known as Eastern Crown in English heraldry), symbolising the federation of monarchies under the protection of the United Kingdom. A banner with the phrase "Dipelihara Allah" (Under God's (Allah) Protection) written in Jawi is located underneath the shield.

The combinations of the four colours of the shield represents the colours of the flags of the states of the FMS in the same way the stripes of the FMS flag do.

 Red and yellow for Selangor
 Black, white and yellow for Perak
 Red, black and yellow for Negeri Sembilan
 Black and white for Pahang

This design forms the basis of the Federation of Malaya's national emblem along with the guardian tigers and a quartered shield of the same, symbolic four colours mentioned above.

The phrase "Dipelihara Allah" was also adopted as the current state motto for the state of Selangor.

Naval Ensign

In addition to a state flag, the Federated Malay States also had a naval jack or ensign for use on government ships. The ensign, with the four colours of the FMS, was flown by HMS Malaya, commanded by Captain Boyle under the 5th Battle Squadron of the British Grand Fleet) during the Battle of Jutland in the North Sea. This was the largest and the only full-scale clash of battleships during World War I.

Government

Resident-General 
From 1896 to 1936, real power lay in the hands of the Resident-General, later known as Chief Secretary of the Federation.

Chief Secretary to the Government

Federal Secretaries 
After 1936 the Federal Secretaries were no more than co-ordinating officers,
under the authority of the High Commissioners, which are always the Governors of the Straits Settlements

State Council 
In the Federated Malay States, the individual State were still ruled by the Sultan but was now advised by the State Council for the purpose of administrating the State. The State Council was made up of the Resident (or in certain cases by the Secretary to the Resident), native chiefs, and representative(s) of the Chinese community nominated by the Sultan. The council discussed matters of interest for each respective state such as legislative and administrative issues as well as revision of all sentence of capital punishment. The Resident and his staff (mostly consist of European and Malay) carried on with the administrative work.

Residents

Selangor 
 1875 – 1876 James Guthrie Davidson
 1876 – 1882 William Bloomfield Douglas                 (born 1822 – died 1906)
 1882 – 1884 Frank Athelstane Swettenham        (born 1850 – died 1946)
 1884 – 1888 John Pickersgill Rodger (1st time) (acting) (born 1851 – died 1910)
 1889 – 1892 William Edward Maxwell             (born 1846 – died 1897)
 1892 – 1896 William Hood Treacher              (born 1849 – died 1919)
 1896 – 1902 John Pickersgill Rodger (2nd time) (s.a.)
 1902 – 1910 Henry Conway Belfield             (born 1855 – died 1923)
 1910 – 1913 Reginald George Watson             (born 1862 – died 1926)
 1913 – 1919 Edward George Broadrick            (born 1864 – died 1929)
 1919 – 1921 Arthur Henry Lemon                 (born 1864 – died 1933)
 1921 – 1926 Oswald Francis Gerard Stonor       (born 1872 – died 1940)
 1926 – 1927 Henry Wagstaffe Thomson            (born 1874 – died 1941)
 1927 – 1931 James Lornie                       (born 1876 – died 1959)
 1932 – 1933 G. E. Cater     (born 1884 – died 1973)
 1933 – 1935 George Ernest London               (born 1889 – died 1957)
 1935 – 1937 Theodore Samuel Adams              (born 1885 – died 1961)
 1937 – 1939 Stanley Wilson Jones               (born 1888 – died 1962)
 1939 – 1941 G. M. Kidd
 1941 Norman Rowlstone Jarrett (acting)  (born 1889 – died 1982)

Perak 

 1874 – 1875 James Wheeler Woodford Birch       (born 1826 – died 1875)
 1876 – 1877 James Guthrie Davidson
 1877 – 1889 Hugh Low (from 1883, Sir Hugh Low) (born 1824 – died 1905)
 1889 – 1896 Frank Athelstane Swettenham        (born 1850 – died 1946)
 1896 – 1902 William Hood Treacher              (born 1849 – died 1919)
 1902 – 1903 John Pickersgill Rodger            (born 1851 – died 1910)
 1905 – 1910 Ernest Woodford Birch              (born 1857 – died 1929)
 1910 – 1912 Henry Conway Belfield              (born 1855 – died 1923)
 1912 – 1913 William James Parke Hume (1st time) (acting)                (born 1866 – died 1952)
 1913 – 1919 Reginald George Watson             (born 1862 – died 1926)
 1919 – 1920 George Maxwell                     (born 1871 – died 1959)
 1920 – 1921 William James Parke Hume (2nd time)                         (s.a.)
 1921 – 1926 Cecil William Chase Parr           (born 1871 – died 1943)
 1926 – 1927 Oswald Francis Gerard Stonor       (born 1872 – died 1940)
 1927 – 1929 Henry Wagstaffe Thomson            (born 1874 – died 1941)
 1929 – 1930 Charles Walter Hamilton Cochrane   (born 1876 – died 1932)
 1931 – 1932 Bertram Walter Elles               (born 1877 – died 1963)
 1932 – 1939 G. E. Cater     (born 1884 – died 1973)
 1939 – 1941 Marcus Rex                         (born 1886 – died 1971)

Negeri Sembilan 
 1888 – 1891 Martin Lister (1st time)           (born 1857 – died 1897)
 1891 – 1894 W. F. B. Paul
 1894 – 1895 Robert Norman Bland                (born 1859 – died 1948)
 1895 – 1897 Martin Lister (2nd time)           (s.a.)
 1898 – 1901 Ernest Woodford Birch              (born 1857 – died 1929)
 1901 – 1902 Henry Conway Belfield              (born 1855 – died 1923)
 1902 – 1903 Walter Egerton                     (born 1858 – died 1947)
 1904 – 1910 Douglas Graham Campbell            (born 1867 – died 1918)
 1910 – 1911 Richard James Wilkinson            (born 1867 – died 1941)
 1912 – 1919 Arthur Henry Lemon                 (born 1864 – died 1933)
 1919 – 1921 J. R. O. Aldworth (acting)
 1921 – 1925 Edward Shaw Hose                   (born 1871 – died 1946)
 1925 – 1928 Ernest Charteris Holford Wolff     (born 1875 – died 1946)
 1928 – 1932 James William Simmons              (born 1877 – died 19...)
 1932 – 1937 John Whitehouse Ward Hughes        (born 1883 – died 19...)
 1937 – 1939 Gordon Lupton Ham                  (born 1885 – died 1965)
 1939 – 1941 John Vincent Cowgill               (born 1888 – died 1959)

Pahang 
 1888 – 1896 John Pickersgill Rodger (born 1851 – died 1910)
 1896 – 1900 Hugh Clifford (1st time) (born 1866 – died 1941)
 1900 – 1901 Arthur Butler (born 18... – died 1901)
 1901 – D. H. Wise (acting)
 1901 – 1903 Hugh Clifford (2nd time) (s.a.)
 1905 – 1908 Cecil Wray
 1908 – 1909 Harvey Chevallier (acting)
 1909 – 1910 Edward Lewis Brockman (born 1865 – died 1943)
 1910 – 1911 Warren Delabere Barnes (born 1865 – died 1911)
 1911 – 1917 Edward John Brewster (born 1861 – died 1931)
 1917 – 1921 Cecil William Chase Parr (born 1871 – died 1943)
 1921 – 1922 F. A. S. McClelland (acting) (born 1873 – died 1947)
 1922 – 1926 Henry Wagstaffe Thomson (born 1874 – died 1941)
 1926 – 1929 Arthur Furley Worthington (born 1874 – died 1964)
 1929 – 1930 C. F. J. Green
 1931 – 1935 Hugh Goodwin Russell Leonard (born 1880 – died 19...)
 1935 – 1941 C. C. Brown

Administrative subdivisions 

For the purpose of efficient administration, all the states of the federation were further divided into districts (Malay: Daerah).  Each district was administered by a District Office (Malay: Pejabat Daerah) headed by a District Officer (Malay: Pegawai Daerah).

Perak 
State capital: Ipoh, Perak

Districts:
 1. Hulu Perak (Upper Perak)
 2. Selama
 3. Larut
 4. Kerian
 5. Matang
 6. Kuala Kangsar
 7. Kinta
 8. Hilir Perak (Lower Perak)
 9. Batang Padang

Notes:
 1. The territories of Dinding and Pangkor Island was ceded to the British, administered as part of the Straits Settlements. Returned to the government of Perak in February 1935.
 2. The capital of Perak was moved to Ipoh in 1935 and has remained there ever since.

Selangor 
State capital: Kuala Lumpur (also as the Federal capital)

Districts:

 10. Hulu Selangor
 11. Kuala Selangor
 12. Kuala Lumpur
 13. Klang
 14. Hulu Langat
 15. Kuala Langat

Negeri Sembilan 
State capital: Seremban

Districts:

 16. Seremban
 17. Port Dickson (Coastal District)
 18. Jelebu
 19. Kuala Pilah
 20. Tampin

Notes:
Tanjung Tuan (also known as Cape Rachado) was a Dutch possession (originally Portuguese before 1641), passed to the British in 1824. Administered as an exclave of Malacca until today.

Pahang 
State capital: Kuala Lipis

Districts:

 21. Lipis
 22. Raub
 23. Bentong
 24. Temerloh
 25. Kuantan
 26. Pekan

Notes:
 The capital of Pahang was Kuala Lipis until 1953 when it moved to Kuantan.

The Federated Malay States as a forerunner to Malaysia

Justice
The first Supreme Court was established in 1906 and headed by the Judicial Commissioner, in whom supreme judicial authority was vested. The title of Judicial Commissioner was changed to Chief Judge in 1925.

Judicial Commissioners
 Lawrence Colvile Jackson
 1913–1917 Sir Thomas de Multon Lee Braddell
 1919–1920 Sir G. Aubrey Goodman
 1920 Sir John Robert Innes (acting)
 1921–1925 Sir Lionel Mabbot Woodward

Chief Judges
 1925–1929 Sir Henry Hessey Johnston Gompertz
 1929–1932 Sir Lancelot Henry Elphinstone
 1933–1937 Sir Samuel Joyce Thomas 
 1937–? Sir Roger Evans Hall 
 ?–1941 Kenneth Elliston Poyser
 1941–c.1945 Sir Harry Herbert Trusted

Economy

From the earlier period of the federation the currency in used was the Straits dollar issued by the Board of Commissioners of Currency.  As the currency depreciated over time, it was pegged at two shillings four sterling pence in 1906.  In 1939, the British government introduced a new currency, Malayan dollar (ringgit in Malay) for used in Malaya and Brunei replacing the Straits dollar at par value.  It had the smallest denominations of 1 cent to a highest of 1000 Malayan dollar and retained the exchange rate as was from the Straits dollar.

The Federated Malay States main economic activity was mostly focused on agriculture and mining with emphasis on rubber and tin. FMS and Malaya as a whole was the main supplier of these two commodities for the British industrial need. Rubber estates or plantations were established in all four states and tin was mined primarily in the Klang valley in Selangor and the Kinta Valley in Perak.  This labour-intensive economic activities prompted the British to bring in immigrant workers from southern India to work at the plantations and workers from southern China to mine the tin.

The economic condition in the period can be viewed as self-sustainable, as the income of the federation was more than what was expended in terms of maintaining the administration and economic activities.  In the later period, many resources were poured into the development of the city of Kuala Lumpur, as the capital of the federation. This period also saw rapid growth in terms of communications infrastructure such as interstate roads, the expansion of the Federated Malay States Railways' narrow gauge railway line between the Padang Besar and Singapore, and Port Swettenham (present-day Port Klang). Public schools and academic institutions were also opened along with an improvement in public health.  An area in the city was also gazetted as a settlement for the Malay called Kampung Baru.  Public buildings were also constructed such as the Kuala Lumpur railway station, the Government Offices of the FMS and Masjid Jamek.

The table and section below illustrated the economic growth of the federation and its member states.

Note: All values are in Straits dollars (One dollar fixed at two shillings and four pence sterling). Data for Pahang included only from 1890 onwards 

Ref: Harrison, Cuthbert Woodville. An Illustrated Guide to the Federated Malay States. 1923

Selangor
The revenue of Selangor in 1875 amounted to only $115,656; in 1905 it had increased to $8,857,793. Of this latter sum $3,195,318 was derived from duty on tin exported, $1,972,628 from finance, federal receipts, and $340,360 from land revenue. The trade balance was chiefly derived from the revenue farms, which included the right to collect import duty on opium and spirits. The expenditure for 1905 amounted to $7,186,146, of which sum $3,717,238 was on account of federal charges and $1,850,711 for public works. The value of the imports in 1905 was $24,643,619 and that of the exports was $26,683,316, making a total of $51,326,935 equivalent to £5,988,000. Tin is the principal export. The amount exported in 1905 was 17,254 tons.

Perak
The revenue of Perak in 1874 amounted to $226,333.  That for 1905 amounted to $12,242,897. Of this latter sum $4,876,400 was derived from duty on exported tin, $2,489,300 from railway receipts, $505,300 from land revenue and $142,800 from postal and telegraphic revenue.  The remainder is mainly derived from the revenue farms, which are leased for a short term of years, conveying to the lessee the right to collect import duties upon opium, wine and spirits, to keep pawnbroking shops, and to keep public licensed gambling-houses for the use of non-Malay only.  The expenditure for 1905 amounted to $10,141,980. Of this sum $4,236,000 was expended upon railway upkeep and construction and $2,176,100 upon public works.  The value of the imports into Perak during 1905 was over $20,000,000, and that of the exports exceeded $40,000,000, making a total of over $60,000,000, equivalent to about seven million sterling. The output of tin from Perak ranged between 18,960 tons, valued at $23,099,506 in 1899, and 26,600 tons, valued at $35,500,000, in 1905.  The fluctuating character of the output was due to the uncertainty of the labour supply. The mining population was recruited exclusively from the districts of southern China, and during certain years an increased demand for labourers in China itself, in French Indo-China, in the Dutch colonies, and in South Africa temporarily and adversely affected immigration to the Straits of Malacca.  The output had, moreover, been affected from time to time by the price of tin, which was $32.20 per pikul in 1896, rose to $42.96 in 1898, to $74.15 in 1900, and averaged $80.60 in 1905.  Exclusive of tin, the principal exports were $108,000 worth of Para rubber, $181,000 of copra, $54,000 of hides, $48,000 of patchouli, and considerable quantities of timber, rattans and other jungle produce.

Negeri Sembilan
The revenue of the Negri Sembilan amounted to only $223,435 in 1888. In 1898 it had increased to $701,334, in 1900 to $1,251,366, and in 1905 to $2,335,534.  The revenue for 1905 was derived mainly as follows: – customs $1,268,602, land revenue $145,475, land sales $21,407, while the revenue farms contributed $584,459.  The expenditure in 1905 amounted to $2,214,093, of which $1,125,355 was expended upon public works.  The trade returns for 1905, which are not, however, complete, showed an aggregate value of about $13,000,000. The value of the tin exported during 1905 exceeded $6,900,000, and the value of the agricultural produce, of which gambier represented $211,000 and damar $80,000, amounted to $407,990.

Pahang
The revenue of Pahang in 1899 amounted to only $62,077; in 1900 to $419,150.  In 1905 it was $528,368.  The expenditure in 1905 amounted to $1,208,176.  Of this sum $736,886 was expended on public works.  Pahang is still a source of expense to the federation, its progress having been retarded by the disturbances which lasted from December 1891 until 1895, with short intervals of peace, but the revenue was steadily increasing, and the ultimate financial success of the state is considered to be secure.  Pahang owed something over $3,966,500 to Selangor and $1,175,000 to Perak, which had financed it for some years out of surplus revenue.  The value of the imports in 1905 was $1,344,346, that of the exports was $3,838,928, thus making a total trade value of $5,183,274.  The most valuable export is tin, the value of which in 1905 amounted to $2,820,745. The value of the gutta exported exceeded $140,000, that of dried and salted fish amounted to nearly $70,000, and that of timber to $325,000.

Education

Press and publications

Military history

WWI and the FMS 

With the threat of Germany, the British Navy was in a drive for expansion. As a contribution, the Government and people of the Federated Malay States agreed to finance the commissioning of HMS Malaya; this was a motion proposed in the Federal Council by the Sultan of Perak in 1913 and supported by the Sultan of Selangor. The most modern ships of their day, they formed the 5th Battle Squadron and fought as such at Jutland in 1916. HMS Malaya was also refurbished and was in service throughout World War II.

WWII – Japanese invasion and dissolution

After the Japanese landed in Malaya on 8 December 1941, the Japanese forces began their invasion of the Malay Peninsula. Japanese forces began their invasion of the FMS by crossing the Thailand–FMS border at Kroh. Ipoh, the state capital of Perak, fell on 26 December 1941. Kuala Lumpur, the capital of the Federated Malay States and the State of Selangor, was captured on 11 January 1942. Seremban, the state capital of Negeri Sembilan, was captured two days later. Kuantan, in the eastern component state of Pahang, fell on 30 December 1941, meanwhile the capital, Kuala Lipis was taken by the Japanese on 7 January 1942. With the conclusion of the Battle of Gemas on 15 January 1942, the entire FMS was now in Japanese hands.

All of Malaya including Singapore remained under Japanese occupation until the surrender of the Japanese home islands.

Dissolution of the FMS
After the war the federation was dissolved formally on 1 April 1946, and was incorporated into the Malayan Union thereafter.  This in turn was succeeded by the Federation of Malaya in 1948, which gained independence in 1957, and finally the establishment of Malaysia in 1963.

Postage stamps

While the four states issued their own postage stamps as before, there were additional issues for the Federated States as a whole.

Notable event
The Federated Malay States were within the flight path of American aviator Amelia Earhart on the Thailand–Singapore leg of her final and fatal attempt to cross the globe in 1937. She was given permission to enter FMS airspace with provision to land at Taiping Airport on 7 June 1937.

See also
 Unfederated Malay States
 Malay states
 The Straits Settlements
 Federated Malay States Railway
 HMS Malaya
 Pangkor Treaty of 1874
 Federated Malay States Appeals Order in Council, 1912

References

Notes
 Harrison, Cuthbert Woodville. An Illustrated Guide to the Federated Malay States. 1923
 George Palmer Putnam Collection of Amelia Earhart Papers © Purdue University
 Benfield, H. Conway. Handbook of The Federated Malay States sabrizain.org Retrieved 23 January 2018.

 
Malay States, Federated
British Malaya
Malay States, Federated
Former countries in Malaysian history
History of Selangor
History of Perak
History of Negeri Sembilan
History of Pahang
1895 establishments in British Malaya
1946 disestablishments in British Malaya
 
States and territories disestablished in 1946
States and territories established in 1895